Claude Luter (23 July 1923 – 6 October 2006) was a jazz clarinetist who doubled  on soprano saxophone.

Luter was born and died in Paris.  He began on trumpet, but switched to clarinet. He might be best known for being an accompanist to Sidney Bechet when he was in Paris, but he also worked with Barney Bigard and French writer and musician Boris Vian.

Discography
En Concert (06/16/2003)
Puisque Vous Partez En Voyage (01/06/2003)
Jazz Spirituals Disques Vogue SLVLX 426
Parade Disques Vogue CLVLX 221
a Bobino Disques Vogue SLVLX 414
And His Orchestra Disques Vogue LVLX 156

External links
[ All Music]

Dixieland clarinetists
Dixieland saxophonists
French jazz clarinetists
French jazz saxophonists
Male saxophonists
Musicians from Paris
1923 births
2006 deaths
20th-century French musicians
20th-century saxophonists
20th-century French male musicians
French male jazz musicians